Riverside Gardens is a neighborhood of Louisville, Kentucky centered along Campground Road and Lees Lane. In 2007, the first stretch of the proposed 110-mile Louisville Loop bike and pedestrian trail was completed to Lees Lane in Riverside Gardens from Riverview Park. The project included a $2 million bridge over Mill Creek. The concrete trail is expected to be connected to Shawnee Park by spring of 2008. In the future, a wharf and riverfront park is planned for Riverside Gardens.

As of 2000, Riverside Gardens had an estimated population of 1,238.

Geography

References
  

Neighborhoods in Louisville, Kentucky